The Nobel Prize in Literature is awarded annually by the Swedish Academy to authors which, according to the Swedish industrialist Alfred Nobel, the benefactor of the prize, has produced "in the field of literature the most outstanding work in an ideal direction". It is one of the five Nobel Prizes which are awarded for outstanding contributions in chemistry, physics, literature, peace, and physiology or medicine.

Every year, the Swedish Academy sends out requests regularly for nominations of candidates for the Nobel Prize in Literature. Members of the Academy, members of literature academies and societies, professors of literature and language, former Nobel literature laureates, and the presidents of writers' organizations are all allowed to nominate a candidate. Nomination of oneself is not permitted. Despite the yearly invitations for nominations, there have been some years wherein the prize was not conferred due to particular reasons (1914, 1918, 1935) and due to the outbreak of World War II (1940–1943). Besides the prize has been delayed for a year seven times (1915, 1919, 1925, 1926, 1927, 1936, 1949).

Records of nominations are strictly kept secret for 50 years until they are made publicly available. Currently, the nominations submitted from 1901 to 1972 are available. Since 1901 to 1972, there have been 814 writers coming from different parts of the world nominated for the Nobel Prize in Literature, 68 of which were awarded the prize and Albert Schweitzer was awarded by Nobel Peace Prize on 1953. 15 more writers from these nominees were awarded after 1972 and Elie Wiesel was awarded by Nobel Peace Prize on 1986. Only 75 women had been nominated for the prize starting with Malwida von Meysenburg who was nominated once for the year 1901 and 8 of them have been awarded after all. Only one literary society has been nominated, the Pali Text Society for the year 1916.

Though the following list consists of notable literary figures deemed worthy of the prize, there have been some celebrated writers who were not considered nor even nominated such as Anton Chekhov, Jules Verne, Mark Twain, Robert Hugh Benson, Arthur Conan Doyle, Alexander Blok, Marcel Proust, Joseph Conrad, Rainer Maria Rilke, Federico García Lorca, Lu Xun, Sarat Chandra Chattopadhyay, Antonio Machado, Francis Scott Fitzgerald, James Joyce, Christopher Dawson, Virginia Woolf, C. S. Lewis, Simone Weil, Willa Cather, George Orwell, Galaktion Tabidze, Edith Hamilton, Richard Wright, Flannery O'Connor, Langston Hughes and Jack Kerouac.

Nominees by their first nomination

1901–1909

1910–1919

1920–1929

1930–1939

1940–1949

1950–1959

1960–1969

1970–1973 
Nominees are published 50 years later so 1973 nominees should be published at the beginning of 2024.

See also 

 List of Nobel laureates in Literature
 List of female nominees for the Nobel Prize
 List of female nominators for the Nobel Prize

Motivations

References 

+
Lists of writers